Marie Recio, née Marie-Geneviève Martin (10 June 1814 – 13 June 1862) was a French 19th-century opera singer (mezzo-soprano), the second wife of Hector Berlioz.

Biography 
Marie Recio was born in Châtenay-Malabry to a French military father, Colonel Joseph Martin (1758-1836), battalion commander and a Spanish mother. Peter Bloom believes that it is likely that she took singing lessons from the great Italian singer David Banderali (an academic at the Conservatoire de Paris from 1828 to 1849), being the friend of his daughter, Anne Barthe. In the 1830s, she became a professional singer in Paris.

Berlioz and Marie met around 1840. Maybe is it for Marie Recio that Berlioz began Les Nuits d'été, with Absence (1841, the fourth piece of the final collection), which she often sang and that the musician orchestrated as soon as 1843. Berlioz himself confided: "She's meowing like a dozen cats."

Thanks to Berlioz's influence, she made her debut at the Opéra-Comique on 9 October 1841, but it was a fiasco and she only held the position for a few months. Her repertoire was limited: Inès in Donizetti's La Favorite, Isolier in Rossini's Le Comte Ory and Alice in Meyerbeer's Robert le Diable. It seems that the singer had a stage fright that deprived her of her skills.

Marie and Berlioz travelled to Brussels in September 1842 and she accompanied him on his various journeys to Prague in 1846 etc.

The couple lived together from 1844 and for almost twenty years. He married her on 19 October 1854, at the Sainte Trinité church in Paris. During all these years, she became collaborator and manager of the musician.

She died of a heart disease at a friend's home in Saint-Germain-en-Laye at age 48. Her mother, Marie Sotera Villas Recio, stayed with the composer until his last days.

She appeared under the features of actress Renée Saint-Cyr, in La Symphonie fantastique (1942), a feature film by Christian-Jaque.

Bibliography 
 
 
 Pascal Beyls, Marie Recio, 1814-1862 — seconde épouse de Berlioz. 2015, 209 pages ,

References

External links 
 
 Autograph letter from Marie Recio (1843) 
 Lettre of Berlioz mentioning Marie Recio (1854) 
 Chronologie: Marie Recio Biographie on Kronobase.org 

1814 births
People from Châtenay-Malabry
1862 deaths
French operatic mezzo-sopranos
19th-century French women opera singers
Hector Berlioz